Orikhiv Raion was one of raions (districts) of Zaporizhzhia Oblast in southern Ukraine. The administrative center of the raion was located in the city of Orikhiv. Its population was 54,462 as of the 2001 Ukrainian Census. The raion was abolished on 18 July 2020 as part of the administrative reform of Ukraine, which reduced the number of raions of Zaporizhzhia Oblast to five. The area of Orikhiv Raion was split between Polohy Raion and Zaporizhzhia Raion.

Into Polohy Raion:

 Orikhiv Urban Hromada
 Mala Tokmak Rural Hromada
 Preobrazhenka Rural Hromada

Into Zaporizhzhia Raion:

 Komyshuvakha Urban-type Hromada
 Tavriiske Rural Hromada

Geography
Orikhiv Raion was located in the northeast portion of Zaporizhzhia Oblast. Its total area constituted . The Komyshuvakha, Konka, Sherebets, Verkhnia Tersa, and Mala Tokmachka Rivers flowed through the raion.

History
Orikhiv Raion was first established on 7 March 1923 as part of a full-scale administrative reorganization of the Ukrainian Soviet Socialist Republic.

Government
Orikhiv Raion was governed by the Orikhiv Raion Council, which consisted of 48 locally elected deputies. In October 2014, Karina Dudnichenko was elected the chairman of the council.

Administrative divisions

Orikhiv Raion was divided in a way that followed the general administrative scheme in Ukraine. Local government was also organized along a similar scheme nationwide. Consequently, raions were subdivided into councils, which were the prime level of administrative division in the country.

Each of the raion's urban populated places administered their own councils, often containing a few villages and rural settlements within its jurisdiction. However, only a handful of rural populated places were organized into councils, which also might contain a few villages and rural settlements within its jurisdiction.

Accordingly, the Orikhiv Raion was divided into: 
 1 city council—made up of the city of Orikhiv (administrative center);
 1 settlement council—made up of the urban-type settlement of Komyshuvakha
 22 rural councils

Overall, the raion had a total of 60 populated localities, consisting of one city, one urban-type settlement, 54 villages, and 4 rural settlements.

Demographics
In the 2001 Ukrainian census, the raion's total population was 54,462. Of that, 44,618 were Ukrainians, 3,998 were Russians, 197 were Belarusians, 99 were Bulgarians, and 444 belonged to other ethnic groups. The percentage of the population which indicated Ukrainian as their native language constituted 91.37 percent, compared to 8.17% for the Russian language.

References

External links

 

Former raions of Zaporizhzhia Oblast
States and territories established in 1923
1923 establishments in Ukraine
Ukrainian raions abolished during the 2020 administrative reform